Liu Xin, born 1957 in Wuhan, Hubei, is a Chinese scientist.
 
Liu is the Dean of the Faculty of Food and Health Technology at Sun Yat-sen University. In 2008 he was elected to the 11th Chinese People's Political Consultative Conference, representing the agricultural sector, he was assigned to the 39th sub committee.

References

External links
Liu Xin's page at Sun Yat-sen University

Scientists from Hubei
1957 births
Living people
Politicians from Wuhan
Academic staff of Sun Yat-sen University
People's Republic of China politicians from Hubei
Educators from Hubei